24sata is a daily newspaper published in Zagreb, Croatia. As of 2007, it is the highest-circulation daily newspaper in Croatia. It is also most visited news website in Croatia and leading news source on social media platforms.

History and profile
24sata is a daily newspaper in Croatia. It was launched by Styria Medien AG, an Austrian media group, in March 2005. Its first editor-in-chief, Matija Babić, announced that the new newspaper would target "young, urban and modern" audiences.

The first issue of 24sata seemed to be nothing more than the first Croatian daily tabloid newspaper in terms of both its content and format. However, within six months after its launch the paper managed to firmly establish its position as the third daily newspaper in Croatia in terms of circulation (after Večernji list and Jutarnji list). This success was due partly to the attractive price.

After Matija Babić was removed from the post of editor-in-chief on 5 July 2005, Boris Trupčević became the new editor in chief.  Before he joined 24sata he was the publisher of Sanoma Magazines in Croatia. He was succeeded by Renato Ivanuš, and as of 2015. editor-in-chief is Goran Gavranović.

24sata  had a circulation of 116,000 copies in 2013, and was the only Croatian daily that saw its revenue grow that year.

Online
The online version was launched at the same time as the print edition. It became the most visited website in Croatia in 2012. Online version has a Mobile Website, as well as iOS, Android and Windows phone applications.

Awards and recognition
 In 2009, 24sata was awarded the European Newspaper of the Year in the category of Judges’ Special Recognition by the European Newspapers Congress.
 In October 2012, the paper was given the Best Use of Facebook Award at the XMA Cross Media Awards held in Frankfurt, Germany.
 In 2014 INMA awarded 24sata with second place in category Best Idea To Grow Digital Audience or Engagement

References

Bibliography
 

24 sata
24 sata
Croatian-language newspapers
2005 establishments in Croatia
Mass media in Zagreb